FTP server return codes always have three digits, and each digit has a special meaning. The first digit denotes whether the response is good, bad or incomplete:

The second digit is a grouping digit and encodes the following information:

Below is a list of all known return codes that may be issued by an FTP server.

See also 
 List of FTP commands
 List of HTTP status codes

References 

Computer errors
File Transfer Protocol
Internet-related lists